Sideritis cypria, the Cyprus ironwort, is a species of flowering plant in the family Lamiaceae. Erect perennial herb with a woody base, 60 cm high, with densely hairy tetragonal shoots. Leaves, opposite, simple, obscurely serrate, densely hairy, thick, oblanceolate, 3-12 x 1–5 cm. Flowers in verticillasters subtended by the cup-like bracts, zygomorphic, corolla bright yellow. Flowers from June to August. Fruit of 4 nutlets.

Habitat
South-facing, dry limestone cliffs, altitude 300–900 m.

Distribution
A very rare and vulnerable species endemic to Cyprus. Restricted to the Pentadaktylos Range: Buffavento, St. Hilarion, Halevga, Bellapais, Yaïla etc.

Gallery

References

External links
 
 http://www.theplantlist.org/tpl/record/kew-191191

cypria
Endemic flora of Cyprus
Plants described in 1900